Kobiałka may refer to the following places in Poland:
Kobiałka, Legnica County in Gmina Chojnów, Legnica County in Lower Silesian Voivodeship, Poland
Kobiałka, Warsaw, a neighborhood in Białołęka in the north-eastern part of Warsaw
Kobiałka, Milicz, part of the town Milicz, in the northern part of Lower Silesian Voivodeship, Poland
Kobiałka, Łódź Voivodeship, part of the village of Stare Krasnodęby in Gmina Aleksandrów Łódzki in Zgierz County, Łódź Voivodeship,

See also
 Kobiałki, a village in Gmina Wieczfnia Kościelna, Mława County, Masovian Voivodeship, in east-central Poland